Schoenus submarginalis is a species of sedge endemic to the mountains of the Western and Eastern Cape Provinces of South Africa.

Description
The key diagnostic character of S. submarginalis are its relatively narrow (<1.2 mm) and short (<4.2 mm) spikelets. In addition, S. submarginalis has small reddish-purple streaks adjacent to its glume margins. 

Schoenus exilis, Schoenus ligulatus  and Schoenus quartziticus also have narrow spikelets, but these species do not hyaline glume margins with adjacent reddish-purple streaks.  In addition, these three species tend to have either linear-lanceolate or narrow lanceolate spikelets, compared to the wider spikelets of S. submarginalis. 

Schoenus submarginalis is most similar to Schoenus bolusii, but the two species differ in their leaf sheaths. The sheaths of S. submarginalis are firm, whereas those of S. bolusii are membranaceous with reddish-purple-streaking patterns.  Schoenus submarginalis tends to be a slightly taller plant (305-475 mm) compared to S. bolusii (249-310 mm). 

Similar to other sedges, plants in this group are very difficult to identify. It appears that part of this problem is caused by the tendency of the southern African  Schoenus to form hybrids with each other. It is not clear whether Schoenus submarginalis forms hybrids with other southern African Schoenus species.

Taxonomy
Schoenus submarginalis is a species in family Cyperaceae, tribe Schoeneae. Other notable genera in tribe Schoeneae include Lepidosperma, Oreobolus, Costularia, Tetraria and Gahnia. The most closely related species to S. submarginalis are other southern African Schoenus species, specifically, species in the S. cuspidatus and allies group.

Southern African Schoenus were once classified as Tetraria; however, based on molecular and morphological differences, we now know that the two groups are evolutionary distinct. To ensure that this group of sedges is monophyletic (i.e. the genus only has closely related species), several species of Epischoenus and the southern African Tetraria were transferred into Schoenus. In the field, the southern African Schoenus can be distinguished from Tetraria species by their lack of stem leaves and the absence of reticulate sheaths at the bases of the flowering stems.

Distribution and habitat
Schoenus submarginalis is a species of sedge found in mountainous regions of the Western Cape and Eastern Cape Provinces of South Africa. Its distribution ranges from Aynsberg in the west to the Baviaanskloof area in the east, growing at elevations over 600 m on coarse substrates.

Images

References

submarginalis
southern African Schoenus
Flora of South Africa
Flora of the Cape Provinces